There's No 'I' in Cherem is the debut album by American Jewish pop punk band The Groggers, released through CD Baby on August 29, 2011. Originating as a series of demos recorded by lead singer L.E. Doug Staiman in his bedroom, he formed the Groggers in early 2010 after the video for "Get" became a minor viral hit. The album was engineered by Aryeh Kunstler and features vocals from Bram Presser of the Australian Jewish punk band Yidcore.

Background 
Originating as a series of demos recorded by lead singer L.E. Doug Staiman in his bedroom, he formed The Groggers in early 2010 after the video for "Get", originally made as a joke, became a minor viral hit. The album was engineered by Aryeh Kunstler (whose touring band Staiman had previously been a member of) and mixed by Jake Antelis, and features Bram Presser of the Australian Jewish punk band Yidcore on the track "Farbrengiton".

The album title is a combination of the expression "There's no 'I' in 'team'" and cherem, a Jewish communal practice of shunning those considered heretical. Speaking on the title's meaning, guitarist Ari Friedman said in 2012:

Reception
Binyomin Ginzberg of The Forward praised the album for its "good-natured yet sarcastic take on contemporary Judaism". Blogger Heshy Fried, writing for Heeb magazine, called it "pop-punk, feel-good music that makes you bob your head in the car and forget about the stop and go traffic on your morning commute."

Track listing

Personnel
The Groggers
L.E. Doug Staiman – lead vocals, guitar, songwriting
Ari Friedman – lead guitar, vocals
C.J. Glass – bass guitar
Chemy Soibelman – drums

Other
Jake Antelis – mixing
Aryeh Kunstler – engineering
Bram Presser – guest vocals ("Farbrengiton")

References

2011 debut albums
The Groggers albums